Internode  may refer to:

 Internode (botany), a portion of a plant stem between nodes
 Internode (ISP), an Internet service provider in Australia
 Internodal segment, a portion of a nerve fibre

See also
 Node (disambiguation)